The 2019–20 Macedonian Handball Super League (known as the VIP Super Liga for sponsorship reasons) was the 28th season of the Super League, Macedonia's premier Handball league. The league was stopped in March after 17 rounds and was expanded to 16 teams for the next season.

Macedonian Handball Super League was ranked 3rd league in Europe in EHF coefficient rank list published before the season.

Team information 

The following 10 clubs compete in the Super League during the 2019–20 season:

Regular season

Standings

No Play Off: Season is stopped due to COVID-19 epidemic

References 

Handball competitions in North Macedonia
2020 in North Macedonia sport
2019 in North Macedonia sport
2019–20 domestic handball leagues